Ōtsu, Otsu, Ootsu or Ohtsu is a Japanese surname.  Notable people with the surname include:

, Japanese speed skater
, Japanese engineer
, Japanese sailor
, last Director of the Karafuto Agency
, Japanese footballer

Japanese-language surnames